William Frederick Hoeft (May 17, 1932 – March 16, 2010) was a pitcher in Major League Baseball whose career spanned 15 seasons with the Detroit Tigers, Boston Red Sox, Baltimore Orioles, Milwaukee Braves, Chicago Cubs and San Francisco Giants.

Detroit Tigers (1952–1959)
Hoeft was signed by the Detroit Tigers as an amateur free agent in 1950. He made his major league debut on April 18, 1952 for the Tigers, and went on to pitch seven full seasons in Detroit.

On September 7, 1953, Hoeft became the eighth pitcher in major-league history to pitch an immaculate inning, striking out all three batters on nine total pitches in the seventh inning of a game against the Chicago White Sox; it was the first time the feat had been accomplished since 1928. On June 24, 1955, Hoeft surrendered the first home run in the career of Harmon Killebrew, who would eventually hit 573 home runs in his career. Hoeft was selected to the American League squad in the 1955 MLB All-Star Game, although he was not called upon to pitch in the game.

Hoeft was primarily used as a starting pitcher in Detroit, starting in 176 games during his time there. His best season came in 1956 when he won 20 games and pitched 18 complete games.  He also showed occasional potential as a power hitter, once tying an American League record for consecutive home runs by a pitcher with two to begin a game.

Boston Red Sox and Baltimore Orioles (1959–1962)
In May 1959, Hoeft was dealt to the Boston Red Sox for Dave Sisler and Ted Lepcio. He was the losing pitcher in three of his five appearances for Boston and was dealt to Baltimore for Jack Harshman after a little more than a month.

Hoeft remained in Baltimore through the 1962 season, where he was primarily used as a relief pitcher, although he did start 16 games for the Orioles. During the 1961 season, Hoeft posted a career-best Earned Run Average of 2.02 in 12 starts and 23 relief appearances.

San Francisco, Milwaukee and Chicago (1963–1966)
Hoeft was traded along with Jack Fisher and Jimmie Coker from the Orioles to the Giants for Stu Miller, John Orsino and Mike McCormick on December 15, 1962.

In 23 appearances for San Francisco during the 1963 season, Hoeft saved four games and posted an earned run average of 4.44. After the season ended, he was dealt to the Milwaukee Braves, along with Felipe Alou, Ed Bailey and a player to be named later for Del Crandall, Bob Shaw and Bob Hendley. San Francisco ended up sending Ernie Bowman to Milwaukee to complete the deal.

In Milwaukee, Hoeft appeared in 42 games posting a 3.80 earned run average and saving four games..

After the 1964 season, Hoeft entered free agency, and was re-signed by his original team, the Detroit Tigers. He was released during spring training for the 1965 season. Shortly afterward, the Chicago Cubs signed Hoeft to a contract for the 1965 season, where he posted an ERA of 2.81 in two starts and 29 appearances for the Cubs.

Hoeft's last season in Major League Baseball was 1966, as he appeared in 36 games for the Cubs, before being released in August. In August, he was signed by the San Francisco Giants initially as a coach and batting practice pitcher before being activated in September when playing rosters increased to 40 men. He posted a 0–2 win–loss record in four games pitched during his second tour with the Giants, before announcing his retirement at the end of the 1966 season.

Hoeft often entered games as a pinch runner, he had a career .202 batting average (107-for-531) with 73 runs, 18 doubles, 3 home runs, 47 RBI and 67 bases on balls.

Death
Hoeft died from cancer in Canadian Lakes, Michigan, at the age of 77.

References

External links

Billy Hoeft - Baseballbiography.com
The Deadball Era – Obituary

1932 births
2010 deaths
American League All-Stars
Baltimore Orioles players
Baseball players from Wisconsin
Boston Red Sox players
Chicago Cubs players
Deaths from cancer in Michigan
Detroit Tigers players
Major League Baseball pitchers
Miami Marlins (IL) players
Milwaukee Braves players
Richmond Tigers players
Salt Lake City Bees players
San Francisco Giants coaches
San Francisco Giants players
Sportspeople from Oshkosh, Wisconsin
Toledo Mud Hens players